The ramped powered lighter (RPL) was a type of landing craft formerly operated by the Royal Corps of Transport of the British Army, from the 1960s until the 1990s. From the early 1980s onwards it was replaced with the larger ramped craft logistic (RCL). The last RPL was in service in Belize until the main British Armed Forces presence was withdrawn from there in 1994.

References
"Defence Standard 00-3/Issue 3- Design Guidance For The Transportability Of Equipment", 27 May 1985, UK Ministry of Defence

Ship types
Landing craft